Weger is a surname. Notable persons with this surname include the following people:

August Weger (1823–1892), German graphic artist
Benjamin Weger (born 1989), Swiss biathlete
Chester Weger (born 1939), American murderer
George S. Weger (1874–1935), American physician
Kim Weger (born 1980), Canadian speed skater
Mike Weger (born 1945), American football
Tymon de Weger (born c. 1955), Dutch politician